Serdar Kılıç (born 28 March 1958) is a Turkish diplomat and the former ambassador of Turkey to United States. Kılıç previously served as the ambassador to Lebanon from 2008 to 2010 and the ambassador to Japan from 2012 to 2014.

Biography 
Kılıç graduated from TED Ankara College and earned a bachelor's degree in political science from Ankara University. He began working at Turkey's Ministry of Foreign Affairs in 1984 and held various positions. From 2006 to 2008 he was the head of NATO relations in the ministry. Kılıç was the ambassador of Turkey to Lebanon from 2008 to 2010. He served as the Secretary-General of Turkish National Security Council from 2010 to 2012. Kılıç served as the ambassador of Turkey to Japan from 2012 to 2014. He then served as the ambassador of Turkey to United States from April 2014 to March 2021.

In December 2021, it was announced that Kılıç would be Turkey's special envoy for the normalization of relations with Armenia.

Personal life 
Kılıç speaks fluent English. He is married to Zeliha Sinem Kılıç, with whom he has 3 children. His father (İlyas Kılıç) was a CHP member of parliament from Samsun. Kılıç is also a relative of AKP member of parliament from Samsun and former Minister of Youth and Sports Çağatay Kılıç.

References 

Ambassadors of Turkey to Japan
1958 births
Living people
Ambassadors of Turkey to the United States